The 1995–96 Primeira Divisão was the 62nd edition of top flight of Portuguese football. It started on 19 August 1995 with a match between União de Leiria and Marítimo, and ended on 12 May 1996. Starting from this season, Portugal implemented the three points for a win rule, after FIFA formally adopted the system. The league was contested by 18 clubs with Porto as the defending champions.

Porto won the league and qualified for the 1996–97 UEFA Champions League group stage, Benfica qualified for the 1996–97 UEFA Cup Winners' Cup first round, and Sporting CP, Boavista and V. Guimarães qualified for the 1996–97 UEFA Cup; in opposite, União da Madeira, Beira-Mar and Vitória de Setúbal were relegated to the Liga de Honra. Domingos  was the top scorer with 25 goals.

Promotion and relegation

Teams relegated to Liga de Honra
União da Madeira
Beira-Mar
Vitória de Setúbal

União da Madeira, Beira-Mar and Vitória de Setúbal, were consigned to the Liga de Honra following their final classification in 1994–95 season.

Teams promoted from Liga de Honra
Leça
Campomaiorense
Felgueiras

The other three teams were replaced by Leça, Campomaiorense and Felgueiras from the Liga de Honra.

Teams

Stadia and locations

Managerial changes

League table

Results

Top goalscorers

Source: Footballzz

Footnotes

External links
 Portugal 1995-96 - RSSSF (Jorge Miguel Teixeira)
 Portuguese League 1995/96 - footballzz.co.uk
 Portugal - Table of Honor - Soccer Library 
 Portuguese Wikipedia - Campeonato Português de Futebol - I Divisão 1995/1996

Primeira Liga seasons
Port
1995–96 in Portuguese football